Ondřej Tunka (born 29 September 1990) is a Czech slalom canoeist who has competed at the international level since 2008.

He won four medals at the ICF Canoe Slalom World Championships with three golds (K1: 2017, K1 team: 2015, 2017) and a bronze (K1 team: 2018). He also won three gold medals in the K1 team event at the European Championships.

World Cup individual podiums

References

External links

1990 births
Czech male canoeists
Living people
Medalists at the ICF Canoe Slalom World Championships
Sportspeople from Jablonec nad Nisou